Gazar Darreh (also Romanized as Gaz̄ar Darreh and Gezer Darreh; also known as Garz Darreh) is a village in Kalatrazan Rural District, Kalatrazan District, Sanandaj County, Kurdistan Province, Iran. At the 2006 census, its population was 546, in 129 families. The village is populated by Kurds.

References 

Towns and villages in Sanandaj County
Kurdish settlements in Kurdistan Province